Horsfieldia obscurinervia is a species of plant in the family Myristicaceae. It is endemic to the Philippines.

References

obscurinervia
Endemic flora of the Philippines
Endangered flora of Asia
Taxonomy articles created by Polbot